Andrew Bee (born 24 January 1965) is a former Scottish cricketer.  Bee was a right-handed batsman who bowled right-arm medium-fast.  He was born in Bridgnorth, Staffordshire.

Bee made 4 first-class appearances for Scotland between 1988 and 1993, all of which came against Ireland.  In his 4 first-class matches, he took 4 wickets at an average of 90.00, with best figures of 2/20.

He made his List A debut for Scotland against Leicestershire in the 1989 Benson & Hedges Cup.  He made 14 further List A appearances, the last of which came against Essex in the 1993 Benson & Hedges Cup.  In his 15 List A matches for the county, he scored 74 runs at a batting average of 8.22, with a high score of 35.  With the ball, he took 10 wickets at an average of 47.50, with best figures of 4/31.

References

External links
Andrew Bee at ESPNcricinfo
Andrew Bee at CricketArchive

1965 births
Living people
People from Bridgnorth
Scottish people of English descent
Scottish cricketers